The Cabinet of Tonga is the cabinet (executive branch) of the government of the Kingdom of Tonga. It is composed primarily of the ministers of government. The latter, including the Prime Minister, are appointed by the monarch. The Governor of Ha'apai and the Governor of Vava'u also serve on the Cabinet ex officio. When in session and presided over by the monarch, the Cabinet is known as the Privy Council.

Current Cabinet
The current Cabinet was appointed by Siaosi Sovaleni on 28 December 2021. It consisted of ten elected people's representatives, one noble, and one minister outside cabinet - long-serving diplomat Fekitamoeloa ʻUtoikamanu as Minister of Foreign Affairs and Tourism. In addition, Pita Faiva Taufatofua was named Governor of Haʻapai, while Lord Fakatulolo was reappointed as Governor of Vavaʻu.

Agriculture Minister Viliami Hingano died in June 2022. Sione Siale Fohe was appointed to replace him on 2 August 2022. The elections of Tatafu Moeaki, Poasi Tei, and Sione Sangster Saulala were declared void and they were unseated for bribery on 10 August 2022.

On 1 September 2022 Lord Vaea was appointed Minister of Internal Affairs, replacing Sangster Saulala. On 22 October 2022 Tiofilusi Tiueti was appointed as Minister of Finance, replacing Tatafu Moeaki.

Minister of Fisheries Semisi Fakahau died on 27 October 2022.

Tuʻiʻonetoa Cabinet
Tuʻiʻonetoa's Cabinet was appointed by Pohiva Tuʻiʻonetoa after he was elected Prime Minister following the death of ʻAkilisi Pohiva in September 2019.

On 25 January 2021 Samiu Vaipulu was appointed Minister of Justice and Prisons, replacing Sione Vuna Fa'otusia who had resigned in December 2020. Tatafu Moeaki, a non-MP, replaced Vaipulu as Minister for Trade and Economic Development.

Government on 10 October 2019

Past Cabinets

Pohiva Cabinet
The previous Cabinet results from the November 2014 general election. ʻAkilisi Pohiva, leader of the Democratic Party of the Friendly Islands and long-standing leader of the movement campaigning for democracy in Tonga, was elected Prime Minister by the new Parliament on 29 December. He was supported by fifteen of the seventeen People's Representatives: all ten MPs from his party, and five of the seven independent members. Conversely, all nine Nobles' Representatives voted for his rival, Samiu Vaipulu. Pohiva thus became the first commoner in Tonga to be elected Prime Minister by a predominantly elected Parliament. He appointed the following government on 30 December. Drawing from his majority in Parliament, all of his ministers are People's Representatives, with one exception. By law, the Ministry for Land must be entrusted to a Noble, and Pohiva thus invited incumbent minister Lord Maʻafu to retain that position. Pōhiva died on 12 September 2019 and Semisi Sika took over as acting prime minister.

Government on 30 December 2014

Tuʻivakano Cabinet
This Cabinet results from the November 2010 general election, the first enabling ordinary citizens to elect a majority of Members of Parliament, and the first also enabling Parliament to elect the Prime Minister. After being elected Prime Minister by Parliament, Lord Tuʻivakanō appointed the following as his Cabinet. His decision to appoint Dr. Ana Taufeʻulungaki and Clive Edwards, who were not Members of Parliament, was met with some controversy, but Tuʻivakanō defended his choice on the grounds of their experience. It also meant that the Ministry for Women's Affairs would be headed by a woman; as all members of the legislature were men, appointing a Member of Parliament to the position would have meant it being held by a man.

The Democratic Party of the Friendly Islands, which had won twelve of the seventeen seats allotted to people's representatives in the Assembly, requested six seats in Cabinet, but was awarded only two, generating some disagreements within the party itself. Senior party MPs ʻAkilisi Pohiva and ʻIsileli Pulu nevertheless accepted the proposed Cabinet positions.

Lord Tuʻivakanō's first Cabinet, announced at the beginning of January 2011, was thus the following. On 13 January, however, newly appointed Health Minister ʻAkilisi Pohiva (People's representative for Tongatapu 1) resigned, in protest over his party having only two Cabinet positions, and refusing to be bound by collective Cabinet responsibility. He was replaced by ʻUliti Uata (DPFI, People's Representative for Haʻapai 13) on 25 January.

On September 1, 2011, following a reshuffle which switched portfolios around without adding any new minister nor removing any, the Cabinet was as follows:

In mid-April 2012, another reshuffle was announced, to be effective from 1 May. Lisiate ʻAkolo, the Minister for Police, was to become Minister for Finance and National Planning. Sunia Fili, the Minister for Finance and Revenue, was to take over the Police, Prisons & Fire Services portfolio; Sosefo Vakata, Minister for Training, Employment, Youth and Sports, would become Minister for Revenue. Lord Vaea, in addition to retaining his Agriculture, Food, Forests and Fisheries portfolio, would take over Vakata's erstwhile ministry. The reshuffle was implemented on 1 May.

In late June, three ministers (ʻIsileli Pulu (Labour), Sunia Fili (Police) and ʻUliti Uata (Health)) resigned, so as to support a motion of no confidence tabled by their party (DPFI) against the government. On 1 July, Sangster Saulala broke ranks with the DPFI to join the government, but resigned and rejoined the opposition the next day. On 5 July, Lord Tuʻiʻafitu was appointed Minister for Health. The other vacated portfolios remained vacant; Matangi Tonga pointed out that "the selection is difficult because of the very few friendly members of parliament left to choose from", as the (delayed) motion of no confidence loomed. On 13 July, Saulala joined the government once more, as Minister for Agriculture, Forestry, Fisheries and Food. He argued that, although he was breaking ranks with his own party, it was the wish of his constituents.

No further announcement was made until 7 January 2013, when Lord Tuʻivakanō announced the following Cabinet:

On 2 February 2013, there was another reshuffle. Sifa Tuʻutafaiva, DPFI MP for Tongatapu 6, was appointed Minister for Police, Prisons and Fire Services, and Minister for Revenue Services, his first ministerial appointments. Feʻaomoeata Vakata, until then Minister for Revenue Services, was shuffled to the position of Minister of Public Enterprises, replacing Clive Edwards, who retained his other position as Minister for Justice.

On 9 January 2014, Finance Minister Lisiate ‘Akolo was sacked after publicly criticising aspects of the budget. ʻAisake Eke, Independent MP for Tongatapu 5, was appointed in his place.

Sevele Cabinet
For the most part, the Cabinet below results from a reshuffle in May 2009, but Teisina Fuko was subsequently appointed Minister for Revenue Services in October, and Samiu Vaipulu became Minister of Justice in November. John Cauchi became Attorney General in May 2009, but resigned in April 2010.

Source: "Tonga", C.I.A.

External links
 Cabinet of Tonga: information on the Tongan government website

References

Cabinet
Tonga
Main